Senior Trip is a 1981 American made-for-television comedy film, directed by Kenneth Johnson and starring Scott Baio.

Plot
A group of graduating students from a mid-western high school comes to New York City on a trip to celebrate the impending end of school. The students include: Roger Ellis, an ambitious teen aiming for success in big business; David, an aspiring rock star; Judy Matheson, a stagestruck coed actress wannabe; Denise, a free-spirited girl hoping to obtain a degree of sophistication; Fred, a lothario looking for any Big City woman to be with; and Jon Lipton, a would-be artist hoping to make it big. Mickey Rooney also appears as himself.

Cast
 Scott Baio as Roger Ellis
 Faye Grant as Denise
 Randy Brooks as David
 Peter Coffield as Jerry
 Mickey Rooney as Himself
 Jane Hoffman as Mrs. Pritchardson
 Jeffrey Marcus as Jon Lipton (as Jeff Marcus)
 Liz Callaway as Judy Matheson
 James Carroll as Fred
 Ralph Davis as Vic
 Ron Fassler as Bob
 Julia Montgomery as Marlene
 Bernard Barrow as Nathan Aldrich
 Robert Hitt as Stanley Simpson
 Vincent Spano as Dick
 Robert Townsend as Randy
 Jason Alexander as Pete

References

External links

1981 television films
1981 films
1980s teen comedy films
American teen comedy films
CBS network films
Films directed by Kenneth Johnson (producer)
1980s English-language films
1980s American films